Granigyra spinulosa is a species of sea snail, a marine gastropod mollusk in the superfamily Seguenzioidea.

Description
The shell grows to a height of 2.5 mm. The shell has a delicate yellow color with coarse and very conspicuous granulation of the surface. When seen in profile, they appear like little spines. It has about three well-rounded, rather loosely coiled whorls, forming an elevated spire with relatively large, prominent nuclear whorl and a very large body whorl. The well-marked suture is rather deep. The deep umbilicus is relatively large and has rounded walls. The peritreme of the aperture is slightly attached at the suture.

Distribution
This species occurs in the Atlantic Ocean off the Bahamas, found at a depth of over 600 m.

References

External links
 To Biodiversity Heritage Library (5 publications)
 To Encyclopedia of Life
 To World Register of Marine Species

spinulosa
Gastropods described in 1897